Alexis Joseph Depaulis (30 August 1792 – 15 September 1867) was a French sculptor and medallist.

Depaulis was born in Paris, and studied at the École nationale supérieure des Beaux-Arts under Bertrand Andrieu for medal making and Pierre Cartellier for sculpture. He frequently exhibited works at the school's salon from 1815 to 1855.  A collection of his casts, medals and seals are preserved at the school, as well as in the Louvre. He typically signed his medals Depaulis F. Depaulis was appointed a Knight of the National Order of the Legion of Honor in 1834. He died in Paris on 15 September 1867.

References

 The vast encyclopaedia inventory of the sciences, letters and arts, published between 1885 and 1902, H. Lamirault editor, Volume 14, p. 153. Online.
 Benezit Dictionary of painters, sculptors, designers and engravers, 1976, Volume 9, page 123.

External links
 

1792 births
1867 deaths
French medallists
19th-century French sculptors
French male sculptors
19th-century French male artists